North Bengal St. Xavier's College, Jalpaiguri, was the third Jesuit college established in the northern area of West Bengal, India. Founded in 2007, it offers undergraduate courses in arts and sciences and is affiliated to the University of North Bengal.

History 
Xavier's is preceded by two other Jesuit university colleges in the North Bengal area of the state of West Bengal, India: St Joseph's College, Darjeeling (1927) and Loyola College of Education, Namchi (1993). Xavier's has campuses at Raiganj and Siliguri.

The university has two hostels which together accommodate 204 students. There are 41 on the teaching staff and 22 on the support staff. Xavier's Alumni Association of North Bengal was formed in 2013.

Academics

Departments 

Science
Zoology
Botany
Microbiology
Physics
Chemistry
Mathematics
Computer Science

Humanities
English
History & Civics
Geography
Political Science
Sociology
Psychology
Education
Hindi
Bengali

Commerce
Economics
Accountancy
Management

Degrees 

B.A. Honours in English
B.A. Honours in Sociology
B.A. Honours in Geography
B.A. Honours in History

B.A. Honours in Hindi
B.Com. Honours in Accounting
B.Com. Honours in Management
B.Com. General course 

B.B.A. Bachelor of Business Administration
B.C.A. Bachelor of Computer Application
B.Sc. Honours in Zoology (Chemistry & Botany electives)
B.Sc. Honours in Microbiology (Chemistry & Botany electives)
B.A. General (electives: English, History, Sociology, Geography, History, Hindi, Education & Political Science)
B.Sc. Honours in Computer Science (Physics & Mathematics electives)
B.Sc. General (includes Zoology, Microbiology, Chemistry, Botany, Computer Science, Mathematics, Physics)
There are also Career Oriented Programmes (Approved by University Grants Commission), Community College Programmes, and Indira Gandhi National Open University (IGNOU) affiliated courses.

Activities 
Major activities include: X-Travaganza (cultural festival), X-Uberance (two-day annual sports meet), X-Cellence day (to honor student achievements), farewell for seniors (a khata and cultural program), seminars (national & departmental for practical experience), departmental projects/field work (to explore student skills), and student’s leadership program (for select students). There is also a magazine produced by the students, Expressions.

See also

References

External links
North Bengal St. Xavier’s College
YouTube
University of North Bengal
University Grants Commission
National Assessment and Accreditation Council

Jesuit universities and colleges in India
Universities and colleges in Jalpaiguri district
Colleges affiliated to University of North Bengal
Educational institutions established in 2007
2007 establishments in West Bengal